Hildred Mary Butler (9 October 1906 – 8 April 1975) was an Australian microbiologist.

Life
The daughter of Archie Butler, a farmer, and Rose Josephine Hancock, his wife, she was born in Elsternwick, Melbourne and was educated at Lauriston Girls' School, going on to earn a BSc and DSc from the University of Melbourne. From 1928 to 1938, she was bacteriologist for the Baker Medical Research Institute. From 1938 to 1971, she was bacteriologist at the Royal Women's Hospital. During that time, she helped establish a 24/7 bacteriological service at the hospital. 
Butler also served as treasurer for the Victorian Society of Pathology and president of the Association of Hospital Scientists in Victoria. 
She retired in 1971.

Butler published an important monograph Blood Cultures and Their Significance in 1937. 
Her research into causes of infections during and after childbirth were published in 21 papers which were published in Australia and abroad.

Butler died at the Royal Women's Hospital in Melbourne at the age of 68.

References 

1906 births
1975 deaths
Australian microbiologists
Australian women scientists
Scientists from Melbourne
20th-century women scientists
University of Melbourne alumni
University of Melbourne women
People educated at Lauriston Girls' School
20th-century Australian scientists
People from Elsternwick, Victoria